Lehize Hilal Benli (born in 1990) is a Turkish female martial artist competing in the Muay Thai, Kickboxing and wushu.

Early life
She began practising wushu at the age of 15.

Achievements
Wushu
 (56 kg)  3rd European Junior Wushu Championships - October 4–7, 2007, Warsaw, Poland
 (56 kg) 2008 National Wushu Championships - July 17–20, 2008, Ordu, Turkey
 (56 kg) 2009 National Wushu Championships - July 24–26, 2008, Safranbolu, Turkey
 (56 kg) 13th European Wushu Championships -  March 6–13, 2010, Antalya, Turkey

References

1990 births
Living people
Sportspeople from Adana
Turkish sanshou practitioners
Turkish Muay Thai practitioners
Turkish female kickboxers
Turkish female martial artists
Female Muay Thai practitioners
21st-century Turkish women